DIT GAA or Dublin Institute of Technology GAA was a Gaelic Athletic Association university club in Dublin Institute of Technology County Dublin, Ireland. DIT's men's Gaelic football team competed in the Sigerson Cup and the O'Byrne Cup. DIT won its first Sigerson Cup in 2013, defeating UCC in the final by 3-08 to 0-08. The DIT team was managed by Sean Fox, Billy O'Loughlin and Des Newton. Team captain in 2013 was All-Star defender Colin Walshe of Doohamlet in County Monaghan. The team included Aidan O'Shea, Jason Doherty, Darran O'Sullivan, Mark Collins, Tomás O'Connor, Bryan Menton, Kevin O'Brien and a number of intercounty players from several counties.

DIT's hurlers won the Kehoe Cup in 2007.

DIT's Fresher A Footballers have won three All-Ireland titles: 2008 (Paul Flynn, Dublin), 2010 (Aidan O'Shea, Mayo), 2014 (Brian Power, Meath).
DIT won the Ryan Cup (Sigerson League) in 2010 and again in 2013. The club celebrated its 30th anniversary in 2012.

References

External links
 

Gaelic games clubs in Dublin (city)
Gaelic football clubs in Dublin (city)
Regional Technical College Gaelic games clubs
GAA